The San Rafael Mountains are a mountain range in central Santa Barbara County, California, U.S., separating the drainages of the Santa Ynez River and the Santa Maria River.  They are part of the Transverse Ranges system of Southern California which in turn are part of the Pacific Coast Ranges system of western North America.

Geography
Most of the mountain range is within the Los Padres National Forest, and the northern slopes are included in the remote San Rafael Wilderness area.

The highest peaks include Big Pine Mountain (6,820 ft, 2,079 m), San Rafael Mountain (6,593 ft, 2,010 m) and McKinley Mountain (6,220 ft, 1,896 m), none of which are easily accessible except by foot or horse. The highest peak at the southern edge of the range is Little Pine Mountain.

Hurricane Deck is a spectacular block of sandstone that can be found deep in the San Rafael Wilderness.

The Sisquoc River headwaters are on the north slopes of Big Pine Mountain. It is a designated Wild and Scenic River of the United States, and a tributary of the Santa Maria River.

Climate is moderate, with hot dry summers (rare thunderstorms) and cool to cold wet winters. Snow sometimes falls on the higher slopes between December and March during frontal passages. Annual precipitation totals are between 15 and 25 inches.

Peaks
 Big Pine Mountain, 
 San Rafael Mountain, 
 Madulce Peak, 
 Monte Arido, 
 Ortega Peak, 
 Figueroa Mountain

Geology
The mountains mainly consist of sedimentary and metamorphic rocks, of Jurassic age or younger, though there are a few regions of igneous intrusions.  Several prominent faults exist, including the Big Pine Fault, which trends eastward towards the San Andreas Fault about forty miles away.

Habitats
The mountains are steep and rugged, and the lower slopes are dominated by chaparral. This ecosystem is naturally adapted to large, high-severity fires every 30 to 100 years or more. Nearly every area within the San Rafael Mountains has burned within the last century, largely due to an increase in human-caused ignitions. In the more shaded and moist canyons and northern slopes oak woodlands, bigcone Douglas-fir, and Coulter pine are found. Gray pine is also interspersed across the chaparral-dominated slopes.

Above the montane chaparral and woodlands ecosystem zone are stands of conifers of the mixed evergreen forest ecosystem. These stands are composed of Jeffrey pine, ponderosa pine, Coulter pine, sugar pine, singleleaf pinyon pine, white fir, and incense cedar. Snow is common in the winter above about 6,000 feet (1,800 m), though overall the climate of the mountain range is Mediterranean, with mild rainy winters and warm, dry summers.

Human history
The earliest known residents of the San Rafael Mountains were the Chumash Indians, and evidence of their habitation consists of pictograph rock paintings in remote areas.

In historic times, mercury mining was conducted on portions of the southern slopes.  Tailings from these old mines sometimes contain high levels of mercury, and environmental investigations have been conducted to determine if cleanup is necessary and feasible.

The central part of the mountains is included into Santa Ynez Recreation area, a part of Los Padres National Forest, and is a popular hiking destination, with a dozen of campgrounds.

See also
Los Padres National Forest
Santa Ynez Mountains
Sierra Madre Mountains
Mountain ranges of Santa Barbara County

References

External links

 
Transverse Ranges
Mountain ranges of Santa Barbara County, California
Los Padres National Forest
Santa Barbara Ranger District, Los Padres National Forest
Mountain ranges of Southern California